Gregory is a city in western Gregory County, South Dakota, United States. The population was 1,221 at the 2020 census.

History
Gregory was laid out in 1904. The city took its name from its location in Gregory County. A post office called Gregory has been in operation since 1904. The local paper for Gregory and the surrounding county, the Gregory Times-Advocate, was founded in 1910.

On May 8, 1965, an F5 tornado touched down on the town without causing any fatalities.

Geography
Gregory is located along U.S. Route 18 and South Dakota Highway 47 between Burke, seven miles to the southeast and Dallas, four miles to the west. Ponca Creek flows past Gregory, two miles to the south and the headwaters of South Fork Whetstone Creek lie to the northeast.

Gregory has been assigned the ZIP code 57533 and the FIPS place code 26180.

Climate

Demographics

2010 census
As of the census of 2010, there were 1,295 people, 611 households, and 326 families living in the city. The racial makeup of the city was 90.3% White, 0.2% African American, 6.8% Native American, 0.6% Asian, and 2.2% from two or more races. Hispanic or Latino of any race were 0.8% of the population.

There were 611 households, of which 23.9% had children under the age of 18 living with them, 39.4% were married couples living together, 10.5% had a female householder with no husband present, 3.4% had a male householder with no wife present, and 46.6% were non-families. 43.7% of all households were made up of individuals, and 25.9% had someone living alone who was 65 years of age or older. The average household size was 2.05 and the average family size was 2.82.

The median age in the city was 48.5 years. 21.8% of residents were under the age of 18; 6.8% were between the ages of 18 and 24; 17% were from 25 to 44; 28.1% were from 45 to 64; and 26.3% were 65 years of age or older. The gender makeup of the city was 47.8% male and 52.2% female.

2000 census
As of the census of 2000, there were 1,342 people, 613 households, and 351 families living in the city. The population density was 982.6 people per square mile (378.2/km2). There were 718 housing units at an average density of 525.7 per square mile (202.4/km2). The racial makeup of the city was 95.68% White, 3.28% Native American, 0.07% Asian, 0.07% from other races, and 0.89% from two or more races. Hispanic or Latino of any race were 0.89% of the population.

There were 613 households, out of which 25.0% had children under the age of 18 living with them, 47.5% were married couples living together, 7.2% had a female householder with no husband present, and 42.6% were non-families. 40.0% of all households were made up of individuals, and 26.6% had someone living alone who was 65 years of age or older. The average household size was 2.19 and the average family size was 2.94.

In the city, the population was spread out, with 24.0% under the age of 18, 4.4% from 18 to 24, 21.7% from 25 to 44, 22.0% from 45 to 64, and 27.9% who were 65 years of age or older. The median age was 45 years. For every 100 females, there were 84.1 males. For every 100 females age 18 and over, there were 78.9 males.

As of 2000 the median income for a household in the city was $23,173, and the median income for a family was $31,250. Males had a median income of $25,057 versus $16,923 for females. The per capita income for the city was $13,626. About 12.9% of families and 18.8% of the population were below the poverty line, including 25.9% of those under age 18 and 20.7% of those age 65 or over.

Notable person
 Oscar Micheaux, first major African-American feature filmmaker

See also
 List of cities in South Dakota

References

External links

Cities in South Dakota
Cities in Gregory County, South Dakota